The first inauguration of Manuel Roxas as the fifth President of the Philippines and the last president of the Philippine Commonwealth under the United States occurred on May 28, 1946. The inauguration marked the beginning of Manuel Roxas's only term as President and of Elpidio Quirino's only term as Vice President.

1946 in the Philippines
Presidency of Manuel Roxas
Roxas, Manuel